Pallathur is a village in Sivagangai district in the Indian state of Tamil Nadu.

Demographics
 India census, Pallathur had a population of 7840. Males constitute 49% of the population and females 51%. Pallathur has an average literacy rate of 73%, higher than the national average of 59.5%: male literacy is 78%, and female literacy is 69%. In Pallathur, 11% of the population is under 6 years of age.

Educational institutions

 RMM. Girls High School
 Arunachalm Chettiar Hr. Sec. School
 Annamalai Polytechnic, Chettinad
 Alagammai Achi Memorial School
 Seethai Achi School
 Seethalakshmi Achi College for Women

References

 Villages in Sivaganga district